Denis Troch (born 24 October 1959, in Le Blanc-Mesnil) is a French former professional football player and now manager.

Troch's last job in management was with Chamois Niortais, but he left in June 2009 after the club were relegated to the Championnat de France amateur. He is the father-in-law of current Division 1 ES Troyes AC player, Julien Outrebon.

Denis Troch is the CEO of H-CORT Performance, a mental coach for professional athletes, and a counselor for managers or CEOs. He is currently working with the professional cycling team FDJ-BigMat and many international athletes.

Player career
In 1978, Troch signed his first professional contract with the second division club team Red Star as goalkeeper. After playing for Paris SG B, Paris FC, and RCF Paris, Troch had to stop his career as a player due to a broken arm. He  accepted the post of goalkeeper coach for RCF Paris.

Coaching career
Troch remained goalkeeper coach for RCF Paris until December 1989 when he took the position of head manager at Charleville, low ranked in Division 3. Troch maintained the club in Division 3 in his first season, and almost made the team go to Division 2 for his second season. During the summer of 1991, Artur Jorge hired Troch to be his assistant coach for Paris Saint-Germain. The two men worked together at Racing Paris and accepted the challenge at Paris Saint-Germain where they won the national championship in 1993–94.

References

External links
Denis Troch profile at playerhistory.com
Denis Troch profile at chamoisfc79.fr
H-CORT Performance at hcort-performance.com
Arthur Jorge and PSG at psg.fr

1959 births
Living people
People from Le Blanc-Mesnil
French footballers
Association football goalkeepers
French football managers
Paris FC players
Racing Club de France Football players
Stade Lavallois managers
Le Havre AC managers
ES Troyes AC managers
Chamois Niortais F.C. managers
Ligue 1 managers
Amiens SC managers
OFC Charleville managers
Footballers from Seine-Saint-Denis